Ivan Ilić ( born December 19, 1976 in Užice, SR Serbia, Yugoslavia) is a Serbian volleyball player. He was a member of the national team representing Serbia and Montenegro at the 2004 Summer Olympics in Athens.

References 
 
 Ivan Ilić – FIVB World League
  
 Best Sports profile

External links 
 

Living people
1976 births
Sportspeople from Užice
Serbian men's volleyball players
Serbia and Montenegro men's volleyball players
Olympic volleyball players of Serbia and Montenegro
Volleyball players at the 2004 Summer Olympics
Serbian expatriate sportspeople in Austria
Expatriate volleyball players in Austria
Serbian expatriate sportspeople in Poland
Expatriate volleyball players in Poland
Resovia (volleyball) players